Eber Phelps (October 17, 1951) was a former member of the Kansas House of Representatives who represented the 111th district from 1997 to 2013 and from 2017 to 2019.

Elections
Phelps began serving in 1997, was defeated in 2012 by Sue Boldra, and regained his old seat from her in the 2016 election. He served as the Minority Whip in his most recent term, 2017–2018.

He was defeated for reelection in 2018, by Republican Barb Wasinger, in an extremely close race. Wassinger originally was found to have won by 32 votes. A recount and certification, protested by the local sheriff, who was on the three-person elections board, found her margin increased to 35 votes.

Phelps works in sales and marketing for the Glassman Corporation. Prior to his election to the House, Phelps served as mayor of Hays, Kansas and was also on the Hays City Commission.

Committee membership
 Education
 Veterans, Military and Homeland Security
 Aging and Long Term Care
 Legislative Budget

Major donors
The top 5 donors to Phelp's 2008 campaign:
1. Kansas Medical Society 	$1,000 	
2. Kansas Contractors Association 	$1,000
3. Kansas National Education Association 	$750 	
4. Kansas Hospital Association 	$750
5. American Federation of Teachers KS PAC 	$500

References

External links
 Kansas Legislature - Eber Phelps
 Project Vote Smart profile
 Kansas Votes profile
 State Surge - Legislative and voting track record
 Campaign contributions: 2002,  2006, 2008

Democratic Party members of the Kansas House of Representatives
Living people
People from Hays, Kansas
Mayors of places in Kansas
1951 births
Fort Hays State University alumni
20th-century American politicians
21st-century American politicians